Sagna is an arrondissement of Malem Hodar in Kaffrine Region in  Senegal.

References 

Arrondissements of Senegal